Cornelis Jacobus (Cor) Gorter (14 August 1907, Utrecht – 30 March 1980, Leiden) was a Dutch experimental and theoretical physicist. Among other work, he discovered paramagnetic relaxation and was a pioneer in low temperature physics.

Education and career
After his Abitur in The Hague, Gorter studied physics in Leiden, earning his PhD with the thesis Paramagnetische Eigenschaften von Salzen ("Paramagnetic Properties of Salts") under Wander de Haas. From 1931 to 1936 he worked at Teylers Stichting in Haarlem and from 1936 to 1940 at the University of Groningen, before he became a professor at the University of Amsterdam as successor to Pieter Zeeman. In 1946, succeeding W. H. Keesom, he returned to Leiden as a professor. In 1948, as successor to De Haas, Gorter directed the Kamerlingh Onnes Laboratory, remaining there until his retirement in 1973. He died in Leiden in 1980, after suffering for several years from Alzheimer's disease. His doctoral students include Nicolaas Bloembergen and Bert Broer.

Work
In 1936 he discovered paramagnetic relaxation; however, he missed the discovery of nuclear magnetic resonance (otherwise known as nuclear spin resonance), as described by Joan Henri Van der Waals.

With Hendrik Casimir he devised a two-fluid model to explain superconductivity with thermodynamics and Maxwell's equations. Casimir described their collaboration in one of his books. The "Gorter-model" for a second-order phase transition is from this period of his career, as well as the elucidation of the Senftleben effect (change of viscosity and thermal conductivity of paramagnetic gas in a magnetic field).

Gorter studied many aspects of antiferromagnetism in CuCl2·2H2O. With Johannes Haantjes, he developed a theoretical model of antiferromagnetism in a double-lattice substance. After WWII he worked on liquid helium II and developed the theory which is now known as Coulomb blockade, the increase in electrical resistance in metal films at low temperatures. The Gorter-Mellink equation describes the mutual friction of two fluids in liquid helium II.

Prizes and honors
 Membership of the Royal Netherlands Academy of Arts and Sciences in 1946.
 Membership to the American Academy of Arts and Sciences in 1952.
 Fritz London Award in 1966 for his various contributions to the physics of low temperatures. His acceptance speech discusses the discoveries he missed.
 Membership to the United States National Academy of Sciences in 1967.
 Membership to the American Philosophical Society in 1970.
 In the autumn of 2007, the C. J. Gorter Center for High-field MRI was opened in Leiden.

Publications
 scientific articles
 Book (in Dutch) Paramagnetische relaxatie, Leiden, November 1946
 Progress in Low Temperature Physics, six parts under his editorship

References

Sources
 Biography
  Biografie door H.A.M. Snelders in Biografisch Woordenboek van Nederland

External links

Oral History Transcript — Dr. C. J. Gorter, Niels Bohr Library & Archives with the Center for History of Physics of the American Institute of Physics

1907 births
1980 deaths
20th-century Dutch physicists
Leiden University alumni
Academic staff of the University of Amsterdam
Academic staff of Leiden University
Scientists from Utrecht (city)
Members of the Royal Netherlands Academy of Arts and Sciences
Foreign associates of the National Academy of Sciences
Members of the Royal Swedish Academy of Sciences
Members of the American Philosophical Society